The 2015–16 season is the 84th season in Real Zaragoza ’s history and the 19th in the second-tier of Spanish football.

Squad

 (captain)

Competitions

Overall

Liga

League table

Matches

Kickoff times are in CET.

Copa del Rey

3rd round

References

Real Zaragoza seasons
ZGZ